Hendrik Christoffel "Henk" van de Hulst (19 November 1918 – 31 July 2000) was a Dutch astronomer and mathematician.

In 1944, while a student in Utrecht, he predicted the existence of the 21 cm hyperfine line of neutral interstellar hydrogen. After this line was discovered, he participated, with Jan Oort and C.A. Muller, in the effort to use radio astronomy to map out the neutral hydrogen in our galaxy, which first revealed its spiral structure. Motivated by the scattering in cosmic dust, he studied light scattering by spherical particles and wrote his doctoral thesis on the topic, subsequently formulating the anomalous diffraction theory.

He spent most of his career at Leiden University, retiring in 1984. He published widely in astronomy, and dealt with the solar corona, and interstellar clouds. After 1960 he was a leader in international space research projects.

In 1956 he became member of the Royal Netherlands Academy of Arts and Sciences.

Books
van de Hulst, H.C., Light Scattering by Small Particles, New York, (Wiley, 1957; Dover, 1981), .
van de Hulst, H.C., Multiple Light Scattering, New York, Academic Press, 1980, .

Honors
Awards
Henry Draper Medal of the National Academy of Sciences (1955)
Eddington Medal of the Royal Astronomical Society (1955)
Rumford Medal of the Royal Society (1964)
Bruce Medal of the Astronomical Society of the Pacific (1978)
Karl Schwarzschild Medal of the Astronomische Gesellschaft (1995)
Named after him
Asteroid 2413 van de Hulst
van de Hulst approximation

Honors 

 elected to the American Philosophical Society (1960)
 elected to the American Academy of Arts and Sciences (1960)
 elected to the United States National Academy of Sciences (1977)

References

Bibliography
 

1918 births
2000 deaths
20th-century Dutch astronomers
Utrecht University alumni
Academic staff of Leiden University
Scientists from Utrecht (city)
Foreign Members of the Royal Society
Foreign associates of the National Academy of Sciences
Members of the Royal Netherlands Academy of Arts and Sciences

Members of the American Philosophical Society
Optical physicists